This is a list of the National Register of Historic Places listings in Talbot County, Maryland.

This is intended to be a complete list of the properties and districts on the National Register of Historic Places in Talbot County, Maryland, United States. Latitude and longitude coordinates are provided for many National Register properties and districts; these locations may be seen together in a map.

There are 62 properties and districts listed on the National Register in the county, including 5 National Historic Landmarks.

Current listings

|}

Former listings

|}

See also

 List of National Historic Landmarks in Maryland
 National Register of Historic Places listings in Maryland

References

Talbot